The 2019 Nigerian House of Representatives elections in Ondo State was held on February 23, 2019, to elect members of the House of Representatives to represent Ondo State, Nigeria.

Overview

Summary

Results

Akoko North East/Akoko North West 
A total of 12 candidates registered with the Independent National Electoral Commission to contest in the election. APC candidate Olubunmi Tunji-Ojo won the election, defeating PDP Olawale Ogunleye and 10 other party candidates. Tunji-Ojo received 36.43% of the votes, while Ogunleye received 22.51%.

Akoko South East/Akoko South West 
A total of 9 candidates registered with the Independent National Electoral Commission to contest in the election. APC candidate Adejoro Adeogun won the election, defeating AA Olusegun Ategbole  and 7 other candidates. Adeogun received 34.57% of the votes, while Ategbole received 26.67%.

Akure North/South 
A total of 14 candidates registered with the Independent National Electoral Commission to contest in the election. PDP candidate Adedayo Omolafe won the election, defeating APC Olowookere Ajisafe and 12 other party candidates. Omolafe received 55.34% of the votes, while Ajisafe received 33.22%.

Idanre/Ifedore 
A total of 2 candidates registered with the Independent National Electoral Commission to contest in the election. SDP candidate Tajudeen Adefisoye won the election, defeating PDP Kayode Akinmade. Adefisoye received 53.28% of the votes, while Akinmade received 46.72%.

Ilaje/Eseodo 
A total of 3 candidates registered with the Independent National Electoral Commission to contest in the election. PDP candidate Victor Akinjo won the election, defeating APC Donald Ojogo and 1 other candidate. Akinjo received 60.10% of the votes, while Ojogo received 38.59%.

Ile-oluji/Okeigbo/Odigbo 
A total of 10 candidates registered with the Independent National Electoral Commission to contest in the election. APC candidate Mayowa Akinfolarin won the election, defeating PDP Abayomi Akinfemiwa and 8 other party candidates. Akinfolarin received 44.93% of the votes, while Akinfemiwa received 44.65%.

Irele/Okitipupa 
A total of 9 candidates registered with the Independent National Electoral Commission to contest in the election. PDP candidate Gboluga Ikengboju won the election, defeating APC Albert Akintoye and 7 other party candidates. Ikengboju received 49.75% of the votes, while Akintoye  received 31.74%.

Ondo East/Ondo West 
A total of 13 candidates registered with the Independent National Electoral Commission to contest in the election. ADC candidate Abiola Makinde won the election, defeating ZLP Joseph Akinlaja and 11 other party candidates. Makinde received 31.56% of the votes, while Akinlaja received 24.23%.

Owo/Ose 
APC candidate Oluwatimehin Adelegbe won the election, defeating PDP Olabode Ayorinde and other party candidates.

References 

Ondo
Ondo State elections